Adrien Morillas (born 30 May 1958) is a French former Superbike and Grand Prix motorcycle road racer. He competed in the inaugural Superbike World Championship season in 1988, with French Superbike team - Kawasaki, winning one race at the Hungaroring. His best year in Grand Prix competition was in 1991 when he finished in eleventh place in the 500cc world championship. After his Grand Prix career, Morillas returned to compete in the Superbike World Championship from 1992 to 1995. He participated in the FIM Endurance World Championship in 1993 and 1994, winning the 24 Hours of Le Mans both years. He claimed the Endurance World Championship title for Kawasaki in 1994.

References 

1958 births
French motorcycle racers
250cc World Championship riders
500cc World Championship riders
Superbike World Championship riders
Living people